WCFB (94.5 MHz) is a commercial FM radio station licensed to Daytona Beach, Florida, serving the Greater Orlando area. WCFB is owned by Cox Radio and airs an urban adult contemporary radio format. Its studios and offices are located on North John Young Parkway in Orlando.  On weekdays, WCFB carries the syndicated Rickey Smiley Morning Show, as well as an hour of urban contemporary gospel music at 5 a.m., and a Quiet Storm program at night.

The station has a powerful 100,000 watt Class C signal, heard from St. Augustine to Ocala to Kissimmee.  (The horizontal polarization in 97,500 watts, but increases to the maximum 100,000 with beam tilt.)  The transmitter tower is off Redlands Drive in DeLand.

History

The station first signed on March 31, 1947 as WNDB-FM, the first standalone FM station in the state of Florida; the next year, the newspaper launched an AM outlet, WNDB (1150 AM). It was owned by the News-Journal Corporation, the publisher of the Daytona Beach News Journal. For most of its first two decades, it largely simulcast its AM counterpart. In 1973, it changed its call sign to WDNJ, airing a beautiful music format with some classical music as well.

In 1978, the station switched to soft adult contemporary as WWLV, Love 94.5. On September 25, 1992, after being purchased by New City Communications, WWLV flipped to country as WCFB, using the identifier Young Country B94.5. Some of B94.5 on air personalities included "Big" Steve Kelly, Ellis B Feaster (now at WPOZ in Orlando), & Buzz Jackson. On May 11, 1995, WCFB changed formats to Rhythmic AC, which later evolved to Urban Adult Contemporary as Star 94.5. This makes WCFB the first urban radio station in years in Orlando to challenge longtime WJHM, which switched formats from rhythmic contemporary to urban contemporary by that time. When WJHM returned to Rhythmic Top 40 in 2011, WCFB once again became the de facto Urban outlet in Central Florida, even though it has always stayed in its own lane with its audience rather than try to compete fiercely for listeners.

WCFB was purchased by Cox Communications in 1997.

A tornado on February 2, 2007 knocked WCFB's signal off the air for a brief period, as it destroyed the transmitter site and a nearby building, near Pine Lakes.  The station returned to the air broadcasting from a temporary transmitter located at another Cox owned tower in Christmas for a short period of time before the station's temporary transmitter site moved to high power facilities at a tower in Orange City off of Miller Rd. The replacement tower in Paisley was finished in mid-November 2007. As of October 24, 2008, WCFB has moved back to the Pine Lakes site.

On November 26, 2014, WCFB flipped from Urban AC to classic hip hop. At that time, WCFB dropped the syndicated "Tom Joyner Morning Show", and replaced it with The Steve Harvey Morning Show. However, due to negative audience feedback, in December 2014, WCFB flipped back to Urban AC, with the classic hip hop format moving to their HD3 sub-channel.

Digital subchannels

HD2 and W297BB
WCFB-HD2 broadcasts in the HD Radio hybrid format. In 2014, the HD2 channel began simulcasting on an FM translator at 107.3 MHz with the call sign W297BB. That translator was originally home to Christian AC-formatted WREH and was simulcast on iHeartMedia's WRUM-HD2 before Cox bought the translator in August 2013.

On June 16, 2014, WCFB-HD2 (which dropped an urban gospel format) and W297BB began stunting with a "Wheel of Formats", which consisted of a Christian Contemporary music format known as Rejoice 107.3, and a soft adult contemporary format, 107.3 The Dove. This was followed by a 40-hour loop of The Beatles' "Revolution". On June 19 at noon, WCFB-HD2/W297BB officially flipped to alternative rock, branded as "X107.3". "X" launched with "Pompeii" by Bastille. The translator/HD2 signal also aired Jacksonville Jaguars programming when sister station WDBO was occupied by Miami Dolphins programming. (WDBO owns the affiliate rights in Orlando for both teams.)

On February 22, 2016, at Midnight, after playing "Ways to Go" by Grouplove, W297BB/WCFB-HD2 began stunting with a loop of Newcleus' "Jam On It." At noon, the frequencies flipped to Spanish Hot AC, branded as 107.3 Solo Éxitos.

After the "Exitos" format was tweaked to contemporary hits and moved to WOEX on June 29, 2020, WCFB-HD2 flipped to ESPN Radio's national feed and was later deactivated. The HD2 signal was reactivated in March 2022, carrying a simulcast of former sister station WPYO, pending that station’s sale to Spanish Broadcasting System and eventual format flip. On April 1, 2022 at midnight, WPYO's former CHR format without on-air staff ended up moving to WCFB-HD2 entirely under the "Power Orlando" branding. The first song on "Power Orlando" was "Heat Waves" by Glass Animals. On September 28, 2022 at 7:06 pm, after playing “Astronaut in the Ocean” by Masked Wolf, WCFB-HD2 and all other Cox radio stations in the area went on to simulcast WDBO to provide updates for Hurricane Ian. By September 30, the other local radio stations went back to mostly normal operations, but WCFB-HD2 continued to simulcast WDBO post-Hurricane Ian, showing signs of possibility that “Power Orlando” might be winding down operations. If confirmed, that meant “Power Orlando” would have lasted nearly 2 months longer than the remnants of “96 Rock” that continued on the HD2 sub channel of WDBO-FM (now WOEX), which only lasted a few months. “Power Orlando” did not return to normal operations until Monday, October 10, 2022 at 1:30 pm, in which “I Ain't Worried” by OneRepublic was played.

References

External links
Star 94.5 Website
Pictures of Tower Destruction from Feb 2 2007 tornado

Urban adult contemporary radio stations in the United States
CFB
Cox Media Group
Radio stations established in 1947
1947 establishments in Florida